The Alfa Romeo Tipo 162 was designed in 1939 by the Spanish engineer Wifredo Ricart as a replacement for the 60° V-16 engined tipo 316. The Tipo 162 had an unusual 135° V-16 engine and highly streamlined bodywork.

The engine was designed in Britain by Harry Ricardo, who had a good reputation for designing high-performance engines. The choice of Harry Ricardo was due not only to his reputation but to the fact that the Portello factory was busy producing engines for trucks and airplanes. The result was a square engine with  bore and stroke,  displacement with 2x 2-stage compressors and 2x triple inverted carburetors. The engine was tested on a test bench in the spring of 1940 and delivered  at 7,800 rpm.

Components were manufactured for a total of six cars, but when, on 10 June 1940, Italy declared war on France and Britain, only one car had been completed, that never participated in racing.

In 1941 Wifredo Ricart designed the Alfa Romeo 163, a dual-seat sports saloon prototype that employed technology such as further streamlining, a mid-mounted engine and lightened bodywork. The car in total weighed only , and it had a very low center of gravity. The engine was derived from the Alfa Romeo 162, but fuel was fed without superchargers. The revised engine delivered  at 7,400 rpm. Production of this car was also curtailed by the war.

References

Tipo 162
Grand Prix cars